MarineTraffic is a maritime analytics provider, which provides real-time information on the movements of ships and the current location of ships in harbors and ports. A database of information on the vessels includes for example details of the location where they were built plus dimensions of the vessels, gross tonnage and International Maritime Organisation (IMO) number. Users can submit photographs of the vessels which other users can rate.

The basic MarineTraffic service can be used without cost; more advanced functions such as satellite-based tracking are available subject to payment.

The site has six million unique visitors on a monthly basis. In April 2015, the service had 600,000 registered users.

How it works 

Data is gathered from in excess of 18,000 AIS equipped volunteer contributors in over 140 countries around the world. Information provided by AIS equipment, such as unique identification, position, course, and speed, is then transferred to the main Marine Traffic servers for display via the website in real time. The site uses data from OpenStreetMap on its base map, and the paid version lets users display ship locations on Nautical Charts.

History 

MarineTraffic was originally developed as an academic project at the University of the Aegean in Ermoupoli, Greece.

In late 2007, Professor Dimitris Lekkas published it as a trial version.

Community 
MarineTraffic is highly dependent on its community of radio amateurs or AIS Station operators, its photographers and translators.

In support of the community, MarineTraffic recently made available a free AIS processing tool, under a Creative Commons license.

See also 
 Flightradar24

References 

2007 establishments in Greece
Navigation system companies
Greek websites
Marine websites
Companies based in Athens
Software companies of Greece